Sadhana Aushadhalaya Ltd. is an ayurvedic pharmaceutical company in Bangladesh. Founded in 1914 by Jogesh Chandra Ghosh, it was the first laboratory for the manufacture of ayurvedic medicine in Bangladesh.

The headquarters of the company is located on two acres of land in Gendaria under Old Dhaka. It has 68 sales centers in Bangladesh and has branches in India. There were once about 450 types of drugs, but currently only 120 are prepared.

References

Old Dhaka
Manufacturing companies based in Dhaka
Pharmaceutical companies of Bangladesh
Pharmaceutical companies established in 1914
Ayurveda
Bangladeshi brands
Vaccine producers